Wintz is a surname. Notable people with the surname include: 

Paul Wintz (born 1986), Guyanese cricketer
Raymond Wintz (1884–1956), French painter
Renée Carpentier-Wintz (1913–2003), French painter
Sophia Wintz (1847–1929), Swiss-born British philanthropist